The 1981 Middle Tennessee Blue Raiders football team represented Middle Tennessee State University in the 1981 NCAA Division I-AA football season. Th team finished with a 6–5 record, 4–4 (tied for fourth) in the Ohio Valley Conference.

Schedule

References

Middle Tennessee
Middle Tennessee Blue Raiders football seasons
Middle Tennessee Blue Raiders football